The Parks E. Ball House is a historic house near Aliceville, Pickens County, Alabama. It is the only surviving antebellum brick house in the county.

Description and history 
The rectangular, two-story Federal-style I-house was built in about 1830 for Parks E. Ball. Ball was born around 1803 in the Columbia, South Carolina area. He emigrated to Alabama as a young man and purchased this property in 1826. Inside, the house follows the typical center-hall plan, with a single room to each side of the 12-foot wide passage on the first and second floors. It was added to the National Register of Historic Places on January 18, 1982.

References

National Register of Historic Places in Pickens County, Alabama
Federal architecture in Alabama
I-houses in Alabama
Houses completed in 1828
Houses on the National Register of Historic Places in Alabama
Houses in Pickens County, Alabama
1828 establishments in Alabama